Lachi is a singer songwriter, composer, producer, actress, author, disability advocate and cultural activist based in New York City. Lachi's music is often described as Pop or EDM. Lachi is also the founder of RAMPD.

Early life
Lachi was born in Maryland to Nigerian immigrant parents. Her mother is Dr. Marcellina Offoha, an academic. She grew up in many places, including, upstate New York, West Philadelphia and North Carolina.  She is legally blind, due to Coloboma.

Lachi attended the University of North Carolina at Chapel Hill where she created the all female a cappella group The UNC Cadence. She then moved to New York City to embark upon her music and writing careers while studying music at New York University. Apart from obtaining side music gigs, she worked at the New York District's United States Army Corps of Engineers.

Career

Music career
Lachi began her music career as an unsigned artist, independently releasing the album And This Is My Life… in 2006 and the album Ugly Beautiful in 2008. She was spotted at a South by Southwest showcase by Fanatic Records/EMI, who then signed her for one album. On July 27, 2010, her self-titled album Lachi was released. Songs from the album included the single "We Can Fly" and "Emo Children". During this time, Lachi was featured on Oprah Radio, CW and NPR, and performed at PrideFest (Milwaukee), where she opened for Patti LaBelle.

Lachi later released The Boss EP through Trend Def's Sony imprint in June 2015. In August 2016, Lachi collaborated with Israeli World Music producer Zafrir Ifrach and Moroccan vocalist Maxime Karouchi to create the Mediterranean-infused EDM track Dalale which garnered over a million views on YouTube. She again collaborated with Trend Def studios to co-write and co-produce the song "Rude" which features pop artist Kendra Black and rapper Snoop Dogg.

In 2017 released the EDM Hip Hop crossover track "Living A Lie" featuring Styles P. She then collaborated with Markus Schulz on a song titled "Far" which Schulz placed on his 2018 Trance music album, We Are The Light. The song was also chosen by DJ Armin van Buuren for his mix album A State of Trance Year Mix 2019. In 2019, she wrote and performed Go with Drum and Bass producer Maduk which found placement on several gaming platforms.

In March 2020, Lachi received her second Independent Music Awards nomination for her a cappella arrangement of the song Money by Cardi B. And by October 2020, she had joined the Recording Academy New York Chapter Advocacy Committee. In September 2020, she was featured as a panelist on ADAM Audio's Women in Music 2020 panel.

Throughout 2021, Lachi's music career and advocacy work began to overlap, starting with her appointment to Co-chair The Recording Academy New York Chapter Advocacy Committee.

In February 2022, Lachi released the track Say The Words, attributing the title to a need for society to simply say the word "Disability," a social campaign popularized by civil rights expert and historian Lawrence Carter. The following month, Lachi received a Becoming America grant, from the prestigious Pop Culture Collaborative, to begin work blending disability concepts with popular music. The award resulted in the creation and release of Dance-pop single "Black Girl Cornrows" a song about Self-expression and Visual description written, performed and produced by Lachi, co-produced by Black Caviar (duo) and featuring Yvie Oddly and QuestionATL.

In June 2022, Lachi was elected to Board Governor by the Recording Academy New York Chapter voting membership and appointed the chapter's DEI Ambassador.

Disability advocacy
Lachi began speaking and performing regularly at Disability Pride events and festivals in 2017, promoting disability representation and inclusion in media, After receiving a DEI certificate from RespectAbility, she began advocating for disability visibility on national diversity and inclusion panels. She has also been working closely with the organization Divas with Disabilities.

In 2020, the New York Times listed Lachi as one of the "28 Ways to Learn About Disability Culture."

In March 2021, she launched "The Off Beast," a YouTube series chronicling her journey from low vision to no vision. The Foundation Fighting Blindness partnered on the first several episodes which included interviews with YouTuber Molly Burke and gospel group The Blind Boys of Alabama.

In 2021, Lachi hosted the pilot episode of the PBS series Renegades (a segment showcasing the contributions to American culture of people with disabilities), and she was subsequently dubbed a "a foot-soldier for disability pride" by Forbes Magazine. In the same year, she established the global network RAMPD or Recording Artists and Music Professionals with Disabilities.

Throughout 2021 and 2022, Lachi established herself as a go-to disability advocate in the music industry, speaking with and performing at places like the White House Office of Public Engagement, the United Nations, the Kennedy Center, Lincoln Center, and the BBC, among other notable appearances.

Starting in 2022, RAMPD partnered with the Recording Academy to help make the Grammy Awards more accessible: working to add, a visibly ramped dais, Sign language interpreters, live captioning, and Audio description, American Sign Language and ramps on the red carpet, and in 2023 Lachi herself walked the red carpet with a bedazzled white cane.

Awards and nominations

Discography

Singles and Collaborations

Albums and EPs

Filmography

Publications

Novels

 M. Lachi, The Ivory Staff, A Dark Fairy Tale of Kings and War, Publisher: CreateSpace Independent Publishing Platform, 2019 
 M. Lachi, Death Tengo, Publisher: Running Wild Press, 2023

See also
Mononymous persons

References

External links
 Official Music Page

Living people
American women singer-songwriters
American pop pianists
American women pianists
American women pop singers
Musicians from Baltimore
New York University alumni
University of North Carolina at Chapel Hill alumni
American people of Nigerian descent
Blind musicians
Singers from New York City
Sony BMG artists
Singer-songwriters from Maryland
Novelists from New York (state)
Novelists from Maryland
21st-century American women singers
21st-century American singers
21st-century American pianists
African-American women singer-songwriters
African-American pianists
Musicians with disabilities
Dance music singers
American voice actors
African-American television hosts
American television hosts
American disability rights activists
Year of birth missing (living people)
21st-century African-American women
American blind people
Singer-songwriters from New York (state)